Rudolfus Josefus Maria "Rudie" Lubbers (born 17 August 1945) is a retired Dutch boxer who competed at the 1964 and 1968 Summer Olympics. In 1964 he finished ninth as light-heavyweight and in 1968 fifth as heavyweight.

Nationally, Lubbers won six light-heavyweight and two heavyweight amateur titles. In 1970, he turned professional, and in 1971 won a national heavyweight title, holding it until his retirement in 1981. Internationally, he unsuccessfully competed at several European championships. In 1973 he fought Muhammad Ali in Jakarta and went the full 12 rounds with Ali. In 1986, he was arrested in Portugal for drug trafficking and jailed for four years. After that he worked on funfairs (known as carnivals in standard U.S. English language) with his wife Ria, and eventually became homeless after she was declared bankrupt in 1999.

1964 Olympic record
Below are the results of Rudi Lubbers, a Dutch light heavyweight boxer who competed at the 1964 Tokyo Olympics:

 Round of 32: bye
 Round of 16: lost to Cosimo Pinto (Italy) by decision, 0-5

References

1945 births
Living people
Boxers at the 1964 Summer Olympics
Boxers at the 1968 Summer Olympics
Olympic boxers of the Netherlands
People from Heerhugowaard
Heavyweight boxers
Prisoners and detainees of Portugal
Dutch people imprisoned abroad
Dutch drug traffickers
Dutch male boxers
20th-century Dutch criminals
Sportspeople from North Holland